This is a list of pubs in the city of Dublin, Ireland. Pubs on this list are under the jurisdiction of Dublin City Council.

Dublin pubs

External links

See also

 List of bars
 List of pubs in the United Kingdom
 List of public house topics

References

 
Dublin
Pubs in Dublin
Pubs